The Simon Weldele House is a historic house in Delano, Minnesota, United States, built in 1893.  It was listed on the National Register of Historic Places in 1979 for having local significance in the theme of architecture.  It was nominated as one of the few architecturally significant residences surviving in Delano, and a well-preserved example of the restrained Queen Anne houses once common in Wright County.

Description
The Simon Weldele House is a wood frame building rising two and a half stories.  It is irregular in plan, with multiple gables emerging from a hip roof, and a polygonal corner tower.  Elements of Queen Anne style include the wraparound porch with turned posts, fretwork gable panels, stained glass, and polychrome exterior.

History
Simon Weldele was born in 1860 in nearby Buffalo Township and moved to Delano, a growing railroad town, in 1884, where he opened a saloon.  This house, constructed in 1893, was the first in Delano to have a hot water heater.  Weldele was remembered for being active in civic and church affairs.

See also
 National Register of Historic Places listings in Wright County, Minnesota

References

1893 establishments in Minnesota
Buildings and structures in Wright County, Minnesota
Houses completed in 1893
Houses on the National Register of Historic Places in Minnesota
Queen Anne architecture in Minnesota
National Register of Historic Places in Wright County, Minnesota
Wooden houses in the United States